In May 2021, prolonged rainfall from a series of weather disturbances affected the South Central United States, namely Texas and Louisiana.

Meteorological history
At around 18:00 UTC on May 16, 2021, an outflow boundary developed over Northeastern Texas and moved generally southward. The outflow boundary then dissipated just 12 hours later and was quickly followed by an outbreak of severe thunderstorms over Texas while torrential rainfall began to affect portions Louisiana and Southeastern Texas. As a result of this rainfall, flash flooding began to occur over southeastern Texas and southwestern Louisiana. Throughout the day, several areas of low pressure and outflow boundaries developed over the Texas Hill Country. This caused severe thunderstorms to form over the region, which brought gusty winds, rainfall, and even some reports of hail. The next day, showers and thunderstorms began to develop over South Texas, which brought further rainfall to the area. On May 19, another round of severe thunderstorms moved through both Texas and Louisiana, worsening flooding across both states, and even causing impacts as far away as Oklahoma, Arkansas, and Mississippi.

These storms exited into the Gulf of Mexico, and began to be monitored by the National Hurricane Center (NHC) on May 21 for potential tropical cyclogenesis. Initially only given a low chance to develop, the NHC did note that conditions were slightly favorable for a short-lived tropical depression or storm to form in the western Gulf of Mexico, before the disturbance moved ashore back into Texas. By 12:00 UTC that day, a low-level circulation formed in association with the disturbance, however, the system lacked convection needed to designated as a tropical cyclone. Had the system developed into a tropical storm, it would have either received the name Ana or Bill, if the former had not been taken by another more-organized disturbance near Bermuda.

Effects

Texas

Ahead of the severe weather outbreaks in Texas, flash flood alerts were put in place across Texas, which affected millions of residents.

In Portland, the Green Lake Dam collapsed following heavy rains at the Northshore Country Club. Oer 100,000 residents of Texas lost power.

Louisiana 
All five deaths occurred in Louisiana, four due to driving in flooded waters, according to John Bel Edwards. In Lake Charles, Louisiana, a 24-hour period saw  of rain, a daily record.

References

2021 floods in the United States
Floods in the United States
May 2021 events in the United States